IOK-1 is a distant galaxy in the constellation Coma Berenices.  When discovered in 2006, it was the oldest and most distant galaxy ever found, at redshift 6.96.

It was discovered in April 2006 by Masanori Iye at National Astronomical Observatory of Japan using the Subaru Telescope in Hawaii and is seen as it was 12.88 billion years ago. Its emission of Lyman alpha radiation has a redshift of 6.96, corresponding to just 750 million years after the Big Bang. While some scientists have claimed other objects (such as Abell 1835 IR1916) to be even older, the IOK-1's age and composition have been more reliably established.

"IOK" stands for the observers' names Iye, Ota, and Kashikawa.

See also
Abell 2218
Abell 370
A1689-zD1
UDFy-38135539
List of the most distant astronomical objects

References

Galaxies
Coma Berenices